Björn Forslund (born 11 May 1962) is a Swedish male speed skater. He competed at the 1992 Winter Olympics and participated in the Men's 500 metres speed skating event and in the Men's 1000 metres speed skating event.

References 

1962 births
Living people
Speed skaters at the 1992 Winter Olympics
Olympic speed skaters of Sweden
Swedish male speed skaters
People from Sundsvall
Sportspeople from Västernorrland County
20th-century Swedish people